Alkalihalobacillus patagoniensis is a Gram-positive, rod-shaped and spore-forming bacterium from the genus of Alkalihalobacillus which has been isolated from the rhizosphere of the plant Atriplex lampa from Patagonia.

References

Bacillaceae
Bacteria described in 2005